Hafizi is a surname of Albanian origin. Notable people with the surname include:

Astrit Hafizi (born 1953), Albanian footballer and coach
Mimoza Hafizi (born 1962), Albanian politician

See also
Hafiz (name)
Hafizi Isma'ilism

Surnames of Albanian origin